General McClure may refer to:

Nathaniel Fish McClure (1865–1942), U.S. Army brigadier general
Robert A. McClure (1897–1957), U.S. Army major general
Robert B. McClure (1896–1973), U.S. Army major general